Emily Salvini (31 October 1989 – 3 May 1997) was a seven-year-old girl who was killed in an arson attack in her family home in Reading, Berkshire in May 1997. Her murder has never been solved.

Background 
Emily Salvini was born in Italy on 31 October 1989. Her mother was Katie and her father was Marco Salvini. Katie graduated from Sussex University with a degree in politics and met Marco on a holiday in Italy in the late 1980s. They were married for about a year before Emily was born and lived near Lake Garda for three years before moving to Caversham in Reading, close to Katie's parents. Emily had a brother, Zach, who was four years younger than her. At the time of the attack on the Salvinis' home, Katie and Marco had separated and Katie and her two children were the only occupants of the semi-detached rented house on Hemdean Road in Caversham. Katie worked part-time in a local pub and Marco had regular contact with their children and was reported to visit every Saturday at 10:00 am to take the children out. Emily was a pupil at Caversham Primary School.

Incident 

At approximately 1:30 am on 3 May 1997, telephone wires on Hemdean Road were severed, causing loss of telephone connection to thirty houses. At around the same time, petrol was poured through the letterbox of the Salvinis' home and set alight.

Katie Salvini was woken by three-year-old Zach, who was co-sleeping with her. She noticed heat and a glow around the bedroom door, and flames entered the bedroom when she opened the door. After putting Zach out of the bedroom window onto the ground floor bay window roof, Katie was unable to reach Emily's bedroom through the fire. Zach was handed down to a neighbour, while Katie fell from the bay window ledge. Members of the public unsuccessfully attempted to enter Emily's room using a ladder. After emergency services arrived, Emily was rescued from the house and the three were taken to the Royal Berkshire Hospital. Emily died of smoke inhalation, and the severity of Katie and Zach's injuries required a transfer to the specialist unit at Stoke Mandeville Hospital in Buckinghamshire.

Katie and Zach both underwent surgery for their burns. Zach was discharged from hospital after a few weeks, and Katie was discharged a month after the attack.

Emily's funeral was held in Caversham on Thursday 19 June.

Investigation 

Four hundred people were interviewed in the first few months of the investigation. Thames Valley Police stated that the "calculated and pre-planned" arson attack was a deliberate attempt to murder Katie Salvini and her children. Petrol had been poured through the letterbox of the family's front door and then set alight. Following the attack, police closed off part of Hemdean Road and a mobile incident room was set up in the street. Police interviewed neighbours and searched gardens. Among the items they were looking for was a can of flammable fluid. Two men were arrested and held for questioning over the weekend. They were later released without charge. Katie Salvini had reported to police that her telephone cable had been cut two weeks previously; two men had been questioned then but released without charge.

A few weeks after the attack, police appealed for two men to come forward. A neighbour saw them walking down Hemdean Road and then run back to a blue car at the time of the attack. Both men were described as Asian with one being in his 20s and the other in his 40s. Police were keen to speak to them in the hope they had seen the arsonist. A man was arrested on 17 June, held overnight and then released without charge.

In July 1997, police issued an unusual artist's impression of a "man without a face", which was based on a description given to them by two witnesses who were not close enough to see his facial features. They saw the man at the junction of Hemdean Road and Victoria Road, yards from the Salvini home at 4.40 am, shortly before the fire. He was wearing a padded light lumberjack-style shirt or jacket with a predominantly white check pattern.

In August, police cleared an overgrown area at the junction of Hemdean Road and Victoria Road where the "man without a face" had been seen standing. It was the second time the area had been searched and nothing of interest was found. Police searched drains and the Thames for discarded items.

Legal proceedings 
On 6 August 1997, police arrested a 33-year-old male and his common-law wife at their home in Cavendish Road, Emmer Green. Forensic tests were carried out on the man's vehicle and the couple's home was searched. The man had been previously interviewed by detectives and was arrested on suspicion of murder. His partner was arrested on suspicion of aiding and abetting. Both were released without charge. In October 1998, Thames Valley Police stated that the male remained a suspect in the murder and would remain so for the foreseeable future.

The inquest into her death on 4 November 1997 gave a verdict of unlawful killing.

In April 1999, almost two years after the attack, Katie Salvini made a plea for help to find her daughter's killer and police stated that they believed someone was shielding him or her.

In 2001, Salvini's murder was featured on BBC's Crimewatch TV programme. In 2017, on the twentieth anniversary of the attack, Katie and her son Zach, 23, made a new appeal for information to find Emily's killer. She said that she believed there were two 'very strong suspects' who lived locally and who she had come face-to-face with in the years since the attack. She believed that one of them could have held a grudge against her for standing up for a friend. Thames Valley Police said they would be carrying out new forensic tests on fire debris retrieved from the scene of the crime.

See also
List of unsolved murders in the United Kingdom

References 

1997 murders in the United Kingdom
Child murder
Female murder victims
Incidents of violence against girls
Unsolved murders in England
May 1997 events in the United Kingdom